The Panasonic Leica DG Vario-Elmarit 8–18 mm 2.8-4.0 lens is a digital compact ultra wide angle lens for Micro Four Thirds system cameras. It is a varifocal lens branded with the German label Leica, but manufactured by Panasonic in Japan.

Description 

It is one of the fastest autofocus zoom lenses with a maximum field of view of 107° within the Micro Four Thirds (MFT) system (as at end of 2018). Its weight is little more than 300 grammes, which is rather low compared to similar lenses.

There is almost no distortion visible in automatically compensated pictures taken at any focal length, and therefore, it is not a fisheye lens. Although there is a strongly protruding front lens, any plane filter can be attached via the 67-millimeter-thread. The lens is splash and dust proof as well as freeze proof down to -10° Celsius.

The silent autofocus and the stepless aperture adjustment together with the fast focus tracking with 240 frames per second and high optical quality enable 4K resolution video shooting with this lens.

Comparison  
Due to the smaller image sensor size of the MFT system the depth of field is larger compared to full-frame sensor cameras if the lenses are operated at the same f-number.

Compared to other camera systems with differing normal focal lengths, and therefore different image sensor sizes, the following equivalent values apply to lenses with appropriate properties as the Leica DG 8–18 mm 4.0 in the MFT system. With the parameters given in the table in all camera systems the photographer will get the same angle of view, depth of field, diffraction limitation and motion blur:

External links

 LUMIX G H-E08018

References

008-18
Leica lenses